Oppenheimerite is a very rare uranium mineral with the formula Na2(UO2)(SO4)2•3H2O. Chemically related minerals include fermiite, natrozippeite, plášilite, belakovskiite and meisserite. Most of these uranyl sulfate minerals were originally found in the Blue Lizard mine, San Juan County, Utah, US. The mineral is named after American Theoretical physicist J. Robert Oppenheimer.

Association and origin
Oppenheimerite is associated with other sulfate minerals: fermiite, bluelizardite, wetherillite, blödite, chalcanthite, epsomite, gypsum, hexahydrite, kröhnkite, manganoblödite, sideronatrite, and tamarugite.

Crystal structure
The crystal structure of oppenheimerite is of a new type. It contains chains of the (UO2)(SO4)2(H2O) composition, connected with two types of sodium polyhedra.

References

Uranium(VI) minerals
Sulfate minerals
Sodium minerals
Triclinic minerals
Minerals in space group 2